Bjørnepatruljen is a 1956 Norwegian family film written and directed by, and starring Carsten Byhring, as well as Dan Fosse, Einar Vaage, Jannike Falk and Bente Lindbeck. The film is about a scout patrol on vacation who encounter a group of thieves on the run.

Plot 
Journeying through 1957, the year Bergman released two of his most acclaimed features (The Seventh Seal and Wild Strawberries), made a TV film and directed four plays for theatre, Magnusson has amassed a wealth of archive and contemporary interviews, along with a fantastic selection of clips from his vast body of work.

External links
 
 Bjørnepatruljen at Filmweb.no (Norwegian)

1956 films
1956 drama films
Norwegian drama films
1950s Norwegian-language films
Norwegian black-and-white films